Foshan, alternately romanized as Fatshan, is a prefecture-level city in central Guangdong Province, China. The city is part of the western side of the Pearl River Delta Economic Zone whose built-up (or metro) area was home to 65,694,622 inhabitants as of 2020 (excluding Hong Kong not conurbated yet), making it the biggest urban area of the world.

Foshan is regarded as the home of Cantonese opera, a genre of Chinese opera; Nanquan, a martial art; and lion dancing.

Name

Fóshān is the pinyin romanization of the city's Chinese name , based on its Mandarin pronunciation. The Postal Map spelling "Fatshan" derives from the same name's local Cantonese pronunciation. Other romanizations include Fat-shan and Fat-shun. Foshan means "BuddhaMountain" and, despite the more famous present-day statue of Guanyin (or Kwanyin) on Mount Xiqiao, who isn't a Buddha, it refers to a smaller hill near the centre of town where three bronze sculptures of Buddha were discovered in AD 628. The town grew up around a monastery founded nearby that was destroyed in 1391.

History

Pre-20th century
Foshan remained a minor settlement on the Fen River for most of China's history. It developed around a Tang-era Buddhist monastery that was destroyed in 1391. The Foshan Ancestral Temple, a Taoist temple to the Northern God (Beidi) that was rebuilt in 1372, became the new focus of the community by the 15th century.

By the early Ming, Foshan had grown into one of the four great markets in China, primarily on the strength of its local ceramics but also on account of its metalwork. Under the Qing, its harbor on the Fen River was limited to ships of a thousand tons' burden but it remained well connected with Guangdong's other ports. By the 19th century, Foshan was considered the "Birmingham of China", with its steel industry responsible for the consumption of the majority of the province's iron production.

20th century and onwards
Foshan was connected to Guangzhou and Sanshui by rail in the early 20th century. The Ancestral Temple was converted into the Foshan Municipal Museum upon the victory of the Communists in the Chinese Civil War in 1949.

Foshan remained primarily focused on ceramic and steel production until the 1950s, when it became an urbanizing political center. On 26 June 1951, it left Nanhai County to become a separate county-level city and, in 1954, it was made the seat of the prefectural government. Its economy stagnated as a result of the Cultural Revolution—traditional ceramic ware was forbidden and its workshops were turned to producing Maoist and Revolutionary folderol — but it continued to grow, reaching 300,000 people by the 1970s, making it the province's second city after Guangzhou.

As early as 1973, however, its agriculture and consumer industries were permitted to become an export production base and a modern highway linked it to Guangzhou soon after. This permitted its party secretary Tong Mengqing and mayor Yu Fei to take full advantage when Deng Xiaoping introduced his Opening Up policies after the fall of the Gang of Four.

In 1983, Foshan was promoted to a prefecture-level city with its former core becoming the new Chancheng District but lost the southwestern half of its former territory to Jiangmen. On 8 December 2002, Shunde and Nanhai joined its urban core as a full district. Shunde has gone on to obtain an unusual autonomous status in 2009, placing its oversight in the hands of the provincial government rather than the prefectural one.

Since 2020 a Japanese-themed street in Foshan has become a hit with young people unable to travel abroad due to the coronavirus pandemic. The 100m-long road called Ichiban Street has been outfitted by a local property developer to resemble famous commercial streets in Japan, complete with a sakura tree, an icon of Japan. The “exotic” street is attracting young people from nearby cities like Guangzhou, Zhongshan and Zhuhai as the younger Chinese generation likes many things about Japanese culture and design.

Geography

Foshan lies on the Fen River in the estuaries making up the west side of the Pearl River Delta.

Climate
Foshan experiences a humid subtropical climate (Köppen climate classification Cfa).

Economy
Foshan has been well known for its ceramics since the Ming dynasty, although it was forced to cease production during the Cultural Revolution.

Foshan had a ¥0.8 trillion gross domestic product in 2015, raising its per capita GDP past $10,000. Shunde District in particular has a high standard of living, with its 3,000+ electronical appliance factories responsible for more than half of the world's air conditioners and refrigerators. Foshan now has more than 30 towns specialized in particular industries, including furniture, machinery, and beverages.

The Foshan Hi-Tech Development Zone was founded in 1992. The zone is very close to the national highway G325 as well as Guangzhou Baiyun International Airport. The major industries in the zone including automobile assembly, biotechnology and chemicals processing.

Administration
The prefecture-level city of Foshan administers five county-level divisions, all of which are districts. The five districts are Chancheng, Nanhai, Sanshui, Gaoming and Shunde.

These are further divided into 32 township-level divisions, including 11 subdistricts and 21 towns.

Foshan is close to Guangzhou and considers its link with Guangzhou to be very important. As such, it is part of the Pearl River Delta and Guangdong-Hong Kong-Macau Greater Bay Area metropolis, centered on Guangzhou.

Language
A dialect from the Samyap branch of the Cantonese language is used by the city natives. Besides that, Mandarin is also used, mainly in business and education, although the city natives do not use much of it in their daily lives.

Transportation

In 2013 to 2014, Foshan planned to improve public transportation by putting forward six measures:

FMetro

The first line of FMetro opened in 2010, and another two lines are under construction and due to be completed in 2021 and 2022.

The existing line of FMetro network:
 Line 1 (Guangfo Line): From Xinchengdong Station to Lijiao Station
 Line 2: From Nanzhuang Station to Guangzhou South Railway Station
 Line 3: From Shunde Polytechnic Station to Zhen'an Station

Rail
Foshan is a main interchange for railway routes linking Guangzhou, Hong Kong and western Guangdong Province. It is connected with Hong Kong via the KCRC Guangdong Through Train service from Foshan railway station, an inter-city train service that was extended from Guangzhou to Foshan in the 1990s.

Aviation
The city is served by Foshan Shadi Airport, and later the Pearl River Delta International Airport.

Education

Like other government schools in Mainland China, Mandarin is the primary language of instruction in Foshan's government schools.

Universities:

 Foshan University
 South China Normal University (Foshan campus)

Sports
Foshan is one of the host cities for the 2019 FIBA Basketball World Cup.

The city hosted events during the 2010 Asian Games. Synchronized swimming at the Foshan Aquatics Center and boxing at the Foshan Gymnasium.

In October 2014 the city hosted The Foshan Open golf event on the European Challenge Tour.

Two professional football teams have played in Foshan. From 1989 to 1997 Foshan Fosti (now disbanded) played at the New Plaza Stadium in Chancheng (now demolished). Foshan Fosti mainly played in the second tier, but did play in the eight team top tier in 1993. In 2007, newly created Guangdong Sunray Cave played at Nanhai District Stadium (now demolished), before moving to the Century Lotus Stadium in 2008. Sunray Cave then moved to Guangzhou, although did play the final games of the 2013 China League One back at Century Lotus Stadium. They returned to Guangzhou in 2014 and then disbanded.

Destinations

 Crowne Plaza Foshan Hotel
 Foshan Ancestral Temple (Zumiao)
 Nanfeng Kiln
 Liang's Garden
 Wong Fei-hung Memorial Hall

Sister cities

  Itami, Hyōgo Japan
  La Possession, Réunion, France (since 1989)
  Port Louis, Mauritius
  Oakland, California, United States
  Stockton, California, United States
  Markham, Ontario, Canada (Friendly co-operative)
  Townsville, Queensland, Australia
  Medway, United Kingdom
  Starogard Gdański, Poland
  St. George's, Grenada
  Ingolstadt, Bavaria, Germany (since 2013)

Notable people
 Wong Kei-ying (ca. 1815-1886), Hung Ga master, doctor, father of Wong Fei Hung and one of the members of the Ten Tigers of Canton.
 Leung Jan (1826-1901), Wing Chun master, doctor and instructor of Ip Man
 Wong Fei Hung (1847–1924), Hung Ga master and doctor, honored at a memorial hall in Chancheng.
 Ip Man (1893–1972), Wing Chun grandmaster and instructor of Bruce Lee.
 Pu Jun Jin (born 1984), racing driver
 Wang Yue, (2009-2011), toddler killed in one of the most notorious examples of the bystander effect.

References

External links

 

 
Populated places with period of establishment missing
Prefecture-level divisions of Guangdong